The Brazilian Baptist Convention is a Baptist Christian denomination in Brazil. It is affiliated with the Baptist World Alliance. The headquarters is in Rio de Janeiro.

History

The Brazilian Baptist Convention has its origins in the establishment of the first Baptist Church in Salvador (Bahia) in 1882, by an American mission of the International Mission Board.
It was founded in 1907. According to a denomination census released in 2020, it claimed 9,018 churches and 1,790,227 members.

Social programs
The Convention coordinates several social programs, through the "Missões Nacionais" especially for the rehabilitation of drug addicts, dance and sports and for young people from disadvantaged neighborhoods and housing orphaned children.

Royal Ambassadors
The 'Embaixadores do Rei' organization (Royal Ambassadors in English) has a significant presence in the denomination. It is responsible for the missionary and vocational awakening of pastors throughout 70 years of existence in Brazil.

Schools
It has 3 affiliated theological institutes.

See also
 Bible
 Born again
 Baptist beliefs
 Worship service (evangelicalism)
 Jesus Christ
 Believers' Church

References

External links
Official Website 	
Brazilian Royal Ambassadors Website 

 
Baptist denominations in South America
Evangelicalism in Brazil
Baptist Christianity in Brazil